The 1959 Temple Owls football team was an American football team that represented Temple University as a member of the Middle Atlantic Conference (MAC) during the 1959 NCAA College Division football season. In its fourth and final season under head coach Peter P. Stevens, the team compiled a 0–9 record. The season was part of a 21-game losing streak that began on November 2, 1957, and ended on September 24, 1960. The team played its home games at Temple Stadium in Philadelphia.

Stevens resigned as Temple's head football coach on December 31, 1959. He had been associated with Temple football for 17 years, first as a player, then as an assistant coach for nine years, and finally as head coach from 1956 to 1959.

Schedule

References

Temple
Temple Owls football seasons
College football winless seasons
Temple Owls football